Salah El-Din El-Sahrawi (7 November 1925 – 18 December 2008) was an Egyptian water polo player. He competed in the men's tournament at the 1952 Summer Olympics.

References

1925 births
2008 deaths
Egyptian male water polo players
Olympic water polo players of Egypt
Water polo players at the 1952 Summer Olympics
Place of birth missing
20th-century Egyptian people